Tara Chand (17 June 1888 at Sialkot – 14 October 1973) was an Indian archaeologist and historian specialising in the ancient history and culture of India.  He taught at Allahabad University and served as vice-chancellor in the 1940s.

Career
Chand graduated with a D.Phil. from Queen's College, Oxford, in 1922 with a thesis on "The influence of Islam on Indian culture". Chand later went on to serve as the ambassador of India to Iran, and as Education Advisor within the Government of India.

Biographical data 
Chand was the son of Munshi Kripa Narain. He was appointed ambassador to Tehran from 1951 to 1956 , where he was succeeded by :de:Badruddin Tyabji (Diplomat).

Publications

Recognition
Allahabad University established the Dr. Tara Chand hostel in Chand's memory.  The University Alumni Association grants an annual scholarship in his name.
Tarachand Gold Medal for History is awarded in his name.
Tarachand Gold Medal was awarded to Chandrarekha Mantri for obtaining highest number of marks in history at the All India Higher Secondary Examination of Central Board of Secondary Education held in 1973.

References

Indian academic administrators
University of Allahabad alumni
Nominated members of the Rajya Sabha
Ambassadors of India to Iran
Recipients of the Padma Vibhushan in literature & education
20th-century Indian politicians
20th-century Indian archaeologists
Academic staff of the University of Allahabad
Scholars from Uttar Pradesh
Uttar Pradesh politicians